Phasmomantella  is an genus of praying mantids placed in the tribe Euchomenellini and family Deroplatyidae.  The two known species appear to be endemic to Vietnam.

Species 
The Mantodea Species File lists:
 Phasmomantella pallida (Roy, 2001) - reassigned from Euchomenella (Nha Trang, Vietnam)
 Phasmomantella nuichuana Vermeersch, 2018 – type species (Núi Chúa National Park, Vietnam)

References

External links 
 

Mantodea genera
Insects of Southeast Asia